The Week Of is a 2018 American comedy film written and directed by Robert Smigel in his feature length directorial debut, and co-written by and starring Adam Sandler. It co-stars Chris Rock, Rachel Dratch, Steve Buscemi, Allison Strong, and Noah Robbins, and follows two fathers the week of the wedding of their children. The film is the fourth collaboration between Sandler and Netflix, and was released on the streaming service on April 27, 2018.

Plot
Sarah Lustig and Tyler Cortice are one week away from getting married. Despite Tyler's doctor father Kirby being extremely rich, Sarah's construction worker father Kenny insists on paying for everything, resulting in a very cheap wedding.

In the week leading up to the wedding, the two families are plagued with multiple problems. Kenny, in an attempt to impress Kirby, tries to get his hotel room made over to look more fancy. Unfortunately, the incompetence of the staff results in damage to the other rooms where other members of the family are staying, forcing the Lustigs to let them stay at their house, already crowded with their own family. To make matters worse, the hotel is where the reception is held, and the damage from the poor work threatens it. Despite this, Kenny firmly refuses any help from Kirby, insisting on doing everything by himself.

Due to a misunderstanding, Kenny's elderly uncle Seymour is mistaken for a World War II veteran (he never actually fought). To help save face after accusations from the press, Kenny convinces the mayor to hold the reception, in the guise of a party in Seymour's honor, at City Hall. However, when Seymour dies in an accident during Tyler's bachelor party, Kenny is forced to admit that the legs everyone thought Seymour lost in combat were actually lost to diabetes. This gets back to the mayor, who cancels the party. To cover this, Kenny, his wife Debbie and Seymour's son Charles capture a bunch of bats and dump them down the chimney of City Hall.

The day of the wedding arrives and despite everything, the ceremony goes off without a hitch. During the reception, Kirby confronts Kenny over his behavior and helps him realize that he did it all out of a need to do one more thing for his daughter. Unfortunately, they have this talk while being held up during a dance for a long time, and one of the carriers collapses, spilling water which hits the electronics, starting a fire.

Feeling awful, Kenny admits why he did the things he did to Sarah, who forgives him. The rest of the reception is held at the Lustig house and Kenny and Kirby agree that the latter should pay for the first big family vacation.

Cast
 Adam Sandler as Kenny Lustig
 Chris Rock as Kirby Cortice
 Rachel Dratch as Debbie Lustig
 Vinny Beedle as Scumbag Vinny
 Steve Buscemi as Charles
 Allison Strong as Sarah Lustig
 Chloe Himmelman as Rose Lustig
 Katie Hartman as Robin
 Jake Lippmann as Isaac Lustig
 Scott Cohen as Ron Elliman
 Melanie Nicholls-King as Katrina  
 Jorge Luna as Ignacio
 Noah Robbins as Noah
 Maury Ginsberg as Jay
 Liz Larsen as Julia Katz
 Patricia Belcher as Thelma
 Teddy Coluca as Dominic
 Jim Barone as Seymour 
 Roland Buck III as Tyler Cortice
 Garry Pastore as Mayor John Barone
 Rob Morgan as Cousin Marvin
 Germar Terrell Gardner as Cousin Ethridge
 Chuck Nice as Leonard
 Kenajuan Bentley as Jermaine
 Joel Marsh Garland as Kent the Magician
 Robert Smigel as ER Doctor 
 Dan Patrick as baseball coach 
 Ronnie "The Limo Driver" Mund as Pallbearer
 June Gable as Roberta
 Jared Sandler as Jared
 Jackie Sandler as Lisa

Production
Principal photography began on Long Island, New York in July 2017.

Reception
The film received negative reviews from critics. The site's critical consensus reads, "The Week Of suggests promise in further collaborations between Sandler and Robert Smigel, but its shopworn premise and listless execution aren't enough to recommend it." On Metacritic, the film has a weighted average score of 41 out of 100, based on 11 critics, indicating "mixed or average reviews".

Richard Roeper of the Chicago Sun-Times gave the film 1.5 out of 4 stars, calling it lazy and saying: "Sandler gives a relatively restrained performance as the well-meaning dad. Rock seems barely invested in paying attention to the other actors, and reads his lines as if he’s hoping there won’t be another take and he won’t have to go through this again. Even with helpful title cards telling us it’s 'MONDAY,' 'TUESDAY,' etc., etc., this is a week that feels 10 days long." Peter Debruge, writing for Variety, called the film "lazy and overlong" and said: "Back in autopilot mode, Sandler phones in what may qualify as the lowest-concept comedy of his career — which, thankfully, is not the same as the lowest point in his career (that would be Jack and Jill, the cross-dressing debacle that began the downward slide that landed him at Netflix in the first place)."

References

External links
 

2018 comedy films
2018 directorial debut films
2010s English-language films
American comedy films
English-language Netflix original films
Films about weddings in the United States
Films produced by Allen Covert
Films produced by Adam Sandler
Films scored by Rupert Gregson-Williams
Films shot in New York (state)
Films with screenplays by Adam Sandler
Films with screenplays by Robert Smigel
Happy Madison Productions films
2010s American films